Yves Yersin (4 October 1942 – 15 November 2018) was a Swiss film director. His film Les petites fugues competed in the Un Certain Regard section at the 1979 Cannes Film Festival.

Biography
Yersin studied photography at the Center Vocational de Vevey from 1959 to 1961, and received a Federal Certificate of Capacity. He began advertising photography in 1962 and trained as a cameraman from 1963 to 1964.

While at the Expo 64, Yersin assisted René Crux during the Polyvision slideshow.

Yersin joined the Fondation du Groupe 5 with  Alain Tanner, Jean-Louis Roy, Michel Soutter, and Jean-Jacques Lagrange in 1971.

Filmography
 Swiss Made (1968)
 Quatre d'entre elles (1968)
 Die letzten Heimposamenter (1974)
 Les petites fugues (1979)
 Tableau Noir (2013)

References

External links

Yves Yersin at the Swiss Film Directory

1942 births
2018 deaths
Swiss film directors
Swiss screenwriters
Male screenwriters